Dove-OSCAR 17 (a.k.a. DO-17 or Microsat 2) is a Brazilian educational and amateur radio satellite (BRAMSAT) (AMSAT-BRAZIL) launched on 22 January 1990.

Project 
Dove-OSCAR 17 is one of the results of the so-called Microsat project by AMSAT, manufactured in the 1980s by the civil and electric engineer Junior Torres de Castro (amateur radio operator with callsign PY2BJO), who had been developing his ideas since 1957. He has built, with his own resources, the first artificial satellite for educational and humanitarian purposes: the "Dove".

The device, assembled in a garage in Botucatu, São Paulo, was meant to provide synthesised peace messages for educational institutions at a time when the Cold War was still determining international relations around the world. It has a Digital Orbiting Voice Encoder (DOVE), designed to emit the synthesised voice messages, and also telemetry data transmission (FM Packet AFSK 1200 AX.25 at 145.825 MHz). It is box shaped with dimensions of 21.3 × 23.0 × 23.0 cm, with solar panels on the faces of the cube and weights 12.92 kg. The configuration and assembly was at that time designated as "Microsat".

Mission 
Dove-OSCAR 17 was launched on 22 January 1990 by an Ariane 4 rocket from Centre Spatial Guyanais (CSG). The payload also included the SPOT-2 and other five OSCAR satellites. According to AMSAT, "due to hardware failures that have occurred since launch, the primary mission of providing voice messages of world peace from DOVE has not been fully realized"

Last stable contact with the satellite officially occurred in March 1998 when it had a battery failure. However, because of the still functional solar panels, when the device is properly aligned to the Sun, it transmits its telemetry data.

See also 

 OSCAR Satellites Launches
 List of Ariane launches (1990–99)

References

External links 
 PY4ZBZ's page Collection of videos in Portuguese about the Dove-OSCAR 17
 N2YO's real time OSCAR 17 tracking page
 PU3XGS's page More information on PY2BJO and the DOVE satellite
 Books about the Dove-OSCAR 17

Amateur radio satellites
Space program of Brazil